Mervyn Kularatne (17 August 1938 – ??) was a Sri Lankan a politician. He was the former Deputy Minister of Defence. He was elected to parliament from the Eheliyagoda defeating Vasudeva Nanayakkara in the 1977 general election.

References

1938 births

Members of the 8th Parliament of Sri Lanka
United National Party politicians
Sinhalese politicians
Living people